Jan ten Compe (1713, Amsterdam – 1761, Amsterdam), was an 18th-century landscape painter from the Northern Netherlands.

Biography

According to his biographer Jan van Gool, he was a follower of Jan van der Heyden and Gerrit Berckheyde. He works were in demand by wealthy patrons such as Mayor Rendorp of Amsterdam and Mr. De Groot of the Hague, where Van Gool saw his paintings of prominent buildings and landmarks of Rotterdam, Delft, the Hague, Leiden, Haarlem, and Amsterdam.

According to the RKD he was the pupil of Dirck Dalens III and the teacher of Geerit Toorenburgh. He was also known as Jan ten Kompe or I.T. Conyn.

References

Jan ten Compe on Artnet

1713 births
1761 deaths
18th-century Dutch painters
18th-century Dutch male artists
Dutch male painters
Painters from Amsterdam